Stratusphunk is an album by George Russell originally released on Riverside in January 1961. The album contains performances by Russell with Al Kiger, David Baker, Dave Young, Chuck Israels and Joe Hunt.

Reception
The Allmusic review by Scott Yanow states that "Surprisingly, only three of the six selections are Russell originals ("Bent Eagle" was an early effort by Carla Bley), but the leader's influence can be felt in all of the adventurous and slightly unusual yet swinging music".

Track listing
All compositions by George Russell except where noted
 "Stratusphunk" - 6:08  
 "New Donna" - 8:25  
 "Bent Eagle" (Carla Bley) - 6:16  
 "Kentucky Oysters" (David Baker) - 8:25  
 "Lambskins" (David Lahm) - 7:13  
 "Things New" - 6:55  
Recorded October 18, 1960 in NYC

Personnel
George Russell: piano, arranger, conductor
Al Kiger: trumpet
David Baker: trombone
Dave Young: tenor saxophone
Chuck Israels: bass
Joe Hunt: drums

References

1961 albums
George Russell (composer) albums
Riverside Records albums
Albums produced by Orrin Keepnews
Albums conducted by George Russell (composer)
Albums arranged by George Russell (composer)